The 2012–13 Barys Astana season was the Kontinental Hockey League franchise's 5th season of play and 14th season overall.

Standings

Division standings
Source: Kontinental Hockey League.

Conference standings
Source: Kontinental Hockey League.

Divisions: KHA – Kharlamov Division, CHE – Chernyshev Division

Schedule and results

Regular season

|-  style="text-align:center; background:#fcc;"
| 1 || September 6 || Dynamo Moscow || 1-5 || Teemu Lassila || Luzhniki Minor Arena || 3,053 || 0-1-0-0 || 0 || 
|-  style="text-align:center; background:#fcc;"
| 2 || September 8 || SKA Saint Petersburg || 3-7 || Pavel Poluektov || Ice Palace Saint Petersburg || 11,000 || 0-2-0-0 || 0 || 
|-  style="text-align:center; background:#ffeeaa;"
| 3 || September 10 || Avangard Omsk || 4-5 (OT) || Pavel Poluektov || Omsk Arena || 7,230 || 0-2-0-1 || 1 || 
|-  style="text-align:center; background:#fcc;"
| 4 || September 13 || Ak Bars Kazan || 1-3 || Pavel Poluektov || Kazakhstan Sports Palace || 3,923 || 0-3-0-1 || 1 ||
|-  style="text-align:center; background:#cfc;"
| 5 || September 15 || Salavat Yulaev Ufa || 3-2 || Pavel Poluektov || Kazakhstan Sports Palace || 4,012 || 1-3-0-1 || 4 ||
|-  style="text-align:center; background:#ffeeaa;"
| 6 || September 17 || Neftekhimik Nizhnekamsk || 2-3 (OT) || Vitali Yeremeyev || Kazakhstan Sports Palace || 3,726 || 1-3-0-2 || 5 || 
|-  style="text-align:center; background:#cfc;"
| 7 || September 20 || CSKA Moscow || 3-1 || Vitali Yeremeyev || CSKA Ice Palace || 2,061 || 2-3-0-2 || 8 || 
|-  style="text-align:center; background:#cfc;"
| 8 || September 22 || Lev Prague || 4-2 || Vitali Yeremeyev || Tipsport Arena || 4,713 || 3-3-0-2 || 11 || 
|-  style="text-align:center; background:#fcc;"
| 9 || September 24 || Slovan Bratislava || 2-4 || Teemu Lassila || Ondrej Nepela Arena || 10,055 || 3-4-0-2 || 11 || 
|-  style="text-align:center; background:#cfc;"
| 10 || September 27 || Sibir Novosibirsk || 2-1 || Vitali Yeremeyev || Kazakhstan Sports Palace || 3,171 || 4-4-0-2 || 14 || 
|-  style="text-align:center; background:#fcc;"
| 11 || September 29 || Metallurg Novokuznetsk || 1-5 || Vitali Yeremeyev || Kazakhstan Sports Palace || 3,135 || 4-5-0-2 || 14 || 
|-

|-  style="text-align:center; background:#cfc;"
| 12 || October 1 || Amur Khabarovsk || 3-1 || Teemu Lassila || Kazakhstan Sports Palace || 2,250 || 5-5-0-2 || 17 || 
|-  style="text-align:center; background:#cfc;"
| 13 || October 6 || Atlant Moscow Oblast || 3-1 || Teemu Lassila || Mytishchi Arena || 5,900 || 6-5-0-2 || 20 || 
|-  style="text-align:center; background:#fcc;"
| 14 || October 8 || Lokomotiv Yaroslavl || 2-4 || Teemu Lassila || Arena 2000 || 8,213 || 6-6-0-2 || 20 || 
|-  style="text-align:center; background:#fcc;"
| 15 || October 10 || Torpedo Nizhny Novgorod || 4-5 || Teemu Lassila || Trade Union Sport Palace || 5,500 || 6-7-0-2 || 20 || 
|-  style="text-align:center; background:#cfc;"
| 16 || October 13 || Spartak Moscow || 5-1 || Teemu Lassila || Kazakhstan Sports Palace || 3,225 || 7-7-0-2 || 23 || 
|-  style="text-align:center; background:#cfc;"
| 17 || October 15 || Dinamo Riga || 5-0 || Teemu Lassila || Kazakhstan Sports Palace || 2,467 || 8-7-0-2 || 26 || 
|-  style="text-align:center; background:#cfc;"
| 18 || October 17 || Donbass Donetsk || 6-1 || Teemu Lassila || Kazakhstan Sports Palace || 2,684 || 9-7-0-2 || 29 || 
|-  style="text-align:center; background:#ffeeaa;"
| 19 || October 22 || Vityaz Chekhov || 2-3 (SO) || Teemu Lassila || Ice Hockey Center 2004 || 2,800 || 9-7-0-3 || 30 || 
|-  style="text-align:center; background:#ffeeaa;"
| 20 || October 24 || Severstal Cherepovets || 2-3 (SO) || Vitali Yeremeyev || Ice Palace Cherepovets || 3,526 || 9-7-0-4 || 31 || 
|-  style="text-align:center; background:#ffeeaa;"
| 21 || October 26 || Dinamo Minsk || 1-2 (OT) || Vitali Yeremeyev || Minsk-Arena || 15,000 || 9-7-0-5 || 32 || 
|-  style="text-align:center; background:#fcc;"
| 22 || October 31 || Avangard Omsk || 3-5 || Teemu Lassila || Kazakhstan Sports Palace || 4,072 || 9-8-0-5 || 32 || 
|-

|-  style="text-align:center; background:#fcc;"
| 23 || November 14 || Traktor Chelyabinsk || 3-6 || Vitali Yeremeyev || Kazakhstan Sports Palace || 3,077 || 9-9-0-5 || 32 || 
|-  style="text-align:center; background:#cfc;"
| 24 || November 16 || Avtomobilist Yekaterinburg || 7-2 || Teemu Lassila || Kazakhstan Sports Palace || 2,154 || 10-9-0-5 || 35 || 
|-  style="text-align:center; background:#fcc;"
| 25 || November 18 || Metallurg Magnitogorsk || 3-5 || Teemu Lassila || Kazakhstan Sports Palace || 4,071 || 10-10-0-5 || 35 || 
|-  style="text-align:center; background:#cfc;"
| 26 || November 21 || Traktor Chelyabinsk || 3-0 || Teemu Lassila || Traktor Ice Arena || 7,350 || 11-10-0-5 || 38 || 
|-  style="text-align:center; background:#fcc;"
| 27 || November 23 || Metallurg Magnitogorsk || 1-5 || Teemu Lassila || Magnitogorsk Arena || 5,231 || 11-11-0-5 || 38 || 
|-  style="text-align:center; background:#d0e7ff;"
| 28 || November 25 || Avtomobilist Yekaterinburg || 5–4 (OT) || Teemu Lassila || Yekaterinburg Sports Palace || 3,350 || 11-11-1-5 || 40 || 
|-  style="text-align:center; background:#cfc;"
| 29 || November 27 || Ugra Khanty-Mansiysk || 6–2 || Teemu Lassila || Kazakhstan Sports Palace || 2,612 || 12-11-1-5 || 43 || 
|-  style="text-align:center; background:#ffeeaa;"
| 30 || November 30 || Avangard Omsk || 2–3 (OT) || Teemu Lassila || Omsk Arena || 8,120 || 12-11-1-6 || 44 || 
|-

|-  style="text-align:center; background:#fcc;"
| 31 || December 3 || Vityaz Chekhov || 3–5 || Pavel Poluektov || Ice Hockey Center 2004 || 3,723 || 12-12-1-6 || 44 || 
|-  style="text-align:center; background:#cfc;"
| 32 || December 5 || Severstal Cherepovets || 3–0 || Vitali Yeremeyev || Kazakhstan Sports Palace || 2,176 || 13-12-1-6 || 47 || 
|-  style="text-align:center; background:#cfc;"
| 33 || December 7 || Dinamo Minsk || 7–2 || Vitali Yeremeyev || Kazakhstan Sports Palace || 2,716 || 14-12-1-6 || 50 || 
|-  style="text-align:center; background:#d0e7ff;"
| 34 || December 19 || Dinamo Riga || 3–2 (OT) || Vitali Yeremeyev || Arena Riga || 4,250 || 14-12-2-6 || 52 || 
|-  style="text-align:center; background:#cfc;"
| 35 || December 21 || Donbass Donetsk || 4–2 || Vitali Yeremeyev || Druzhba Arena || 3,556 || 15-12-2-6 || 55 || 
|-  style="text-align:center; background:#d0e7ff;"
| 36 || December 23 || Spartak Moscow || 2–1 (SO) || Teemu Lassila || Sokolniki Arena || 2,846 || 15-12-3-6 || 57 || 
|-  style="text-align:center; background:#d0e7ff;"
| 37 || December 26 || Atlant Moscow Oblast || 5–4 (SO) || Vitali Yeremeyev || Kazakhstan Sports Palace || 2,717 || 15-12-4-6 || 59 || 
|-  style="text-align:center; background:#cfc;"
| 38 || December 28 || Lokomotiv Yaroslavl || 2–0 || Vitali Yeremeyev || Kazakhstan Sports Palace || 2,817 || 16-12-4-6 || 62 || 
|-  style="text-align:center; background:#d0e7ff;"
| 39 || December 30 || Torpedo Nizhny Novgorod || 5–4 (OT) || Vitali Yeremeyev || Kazakhstan Sports Palace || 3,040 || 16-12-5-6 || 64 || 
|-

|-  style="text-align:center; background:#fcc;"
| 40 || January 5 || Amur Khabarovsk || 4–5 || Vitali Yeremeyev || Platinum Arena || 7,100 || 16-13-5-6 || 64 || 
|-  style="text-align:center; background:#cfc;"
| 41 || January 7 || Metallurg Novokuznetsk || 8–6 || Pavel Poluektov || Kuznetsk Metallurgists Arena || 2,800 || 17-13-5-6 || 67 || 
|-  style="text-align:center; background:#fcc;"
| 42 || January 9 || Sibir Novosibirsk || 1–3 || Vitali Yeremeyev || Ice Sports Palace Sibir || 5,500 || 17-14-5-6 || 67 || 
|-  style="text-align:center; background:#fcc;"
| 43 || January 15 || Ugra Khanty-Mansiysk || 4–6 || Pavel Poluektov || Arena Ugra || 2,840 || 17-15-5-6 || 67 || 
|-  style="text-align:center; background:#fcc;"
| 44 || January 18 || CSKA Moscow || 1–8 || Pavel Poluektov || Kazakhstan Sports Palace || 3,887 || 17-16-5-6 || 67 || 
|-  style="text-align:center; background:#cfc;"
| 45 || January 20 || Lev Prague || 5–1 || Pavel Poluektov || Kazakhstan Sports Palace || 2,737 || 18-16-5-6 || 70 || 
|-  style="text-align:center; background:#fcc;"
| 46 || January 22 || Slovan Bratislava || 2–4 || Pavel Poluektov || Kazakhstan Sports Palace || 2,779 || 18-17-5-6 || 70 || 
|-  style="text-align:center; background:#cfc;"
| 47 || January 26 || Salavat Yulaev Ufa || 6–4 || Pavel Poluektov || Ufa Arena || 7,950 || 19-17-5-6 || 73 || 
|-  style="text-align:center; background:#cfc;"
| 48 || January 28 || Ak Bars Kazan || 4–2 || Pavel Poluektov || TatNeft Arena || 3,330 || 20-17-5-6 || 76 || 
|-  style="text-align:center; background:#fcc;"
| 49 || January 30 || Neftekhimik Nizhnekamsk || 1–2 || Pavel Poluektov || Neftekhimik Ice Palace || 5,000 || 20-18-5-6 || 76 || 
|-

|-  style="text-align:center; background:#cfc;"
| 50 || February 1 || Avangard Omsk || 5–4 || Vitali Yeremeyev || Kazakhstan Sports Palace || 4,022 || 21-18-5-6 || 79 || 
|-  style="text-align:center; background:#cfc;"
| 51 || February 13 || Dynamo Moscow || 4–2 || Vitali Yeremeyev || Kazakhstan Sports Palace || 3,717 || 22-18-5-6 || 82 || 
|-  style="text-align:center; background:#cfc;"
| 52 || February 17 || SKA Saint Petersburg || 5–4 || Vitali Yeremeyev || Kazakhstan Sports Palace || 4,017 || 23-18-5-6 || 85 || 
|-

|-
|

Playoffs

|-  style="text-align:center; background:#cfc;"
| 1 || February 21 || Traktor Chelyabinsk || 4–3 (OT) || Vitali Yeremeyev || Traktor Ice Arena || 7,450 || 1-0 || 
|-  style="text-align:center; background:#cfc;"
| 2 || February 22 || Traktor Chelyabinsk || 5–3 || Vitali Yeremeyev || Traktor Ice Arena || 6,800 || 2-0 || 
|-  style="text-align:center; background:#fcc;"
| 3 || February 25 || Traktor Chelyabinsk || 1–3 || Vitali Yeremeyev || Kazakhstan Sports Palace || 4,072 || 2-1 || 
|-  style="text-align:center; background:#fcc;"
| 4 || February 26 || Traktor Chelyabinsk || 2–3 || Vitali Yeremeyev || Kazakhstan Sports Palace || 4,072 || 2-2 || 
|-  style="text-align:center; background:#fcc;"
| 5 || March 1 || Traktor Chelyabinsk || 3–6 || Vitali Yeremeyev || Traktor Ice Arena || 7,500 || 2-3 || 
|-  style="text-align:center; background:#cfc;"
| 6 || March 3 || Traktor Chelyabinsk || 4–2 || Pavel Poluektov || Kazakhstan Sports Palace || 3,574 || 3-3 || 
|-  style="text-align:center; background:#fcc;"
| 7 || March 5 || Traktor Chelyabinsk || 3–5 || Pavel Poluektov || Traktor Ice Arena || 7,500 || 3-4 || 
|-

|-
|

Player statistics
Source: Kontinental Hockey League.

Skaters

Goaltenders

Final roster
Updated March 5, 2013.

|}

Note: Victor Hedman, Ryan McDonagh and Nik Antropov played for Barys during 2012-13 NHL lockout.

Transactions
Source: EuroHockey.com

Note: Victor Hedman, Ryan McDonagh and Nik Antropov played for Barys during 2012-13 NHL lockout.

Draft picks

Barys Astana's picks at the 2012 KHL Junior Draft in Chelyabinsk, Russia at the Traktor Sport Palace from May 25–26, 2012.

See also
2012–13 KHL season

References

Barys Astana seasons
Astana
Barys